Elvira Nikolaisen (born 16 July 1980 in Moi) is a Norwegian singer-songwriter signed for Sony BMG. She released her debut single Love I Can't Defend in December 2005, it reached the number 3 spot on the Norwegian singles list. She followed up the hit with her first album, Quiet Exit, and a second single, Egypt Song, in March 2006. The album peaked at No. 2 in the Norwegian chart.

Career 

Nikolaisen is from a musical family, her father is a church organist and her brother Emil is the vocalist and guitarist for Serena Maneesh, and her sister Hilma is the bassist for the same band. Her brother Ivar is lead singer of the Norwegian punk band Silver. In 1998, Nikolaisen with her brother Emil fronted the independent band Royal. The band released one album titled My Dear on Soulscape Records and distributed through Tooth and Nail Records. While she's from a very religious family, Nikolaisen rejected her Christian beliefs at the age of eighteen. Some of her lyrics reflect the impact of this change on her life.

Nikolaisen released her second album, Indian Summer in April 2008. However, she failed to repeat the success of the debut album, Quiet Exit. On the latest album I Concentrate on You (2013) Nikolaisen in collaboration with the Jaga Jazzist trumpeter Mathias Eick, moves into American popular music, fulfilling her old dream to go into the great American songbook. Other contributors on this album are Ola Kvernberg (violin, viola & bass-violin), Andreas Ulvo (piano, cembalo, celesta) and Gard Nilssen (drums).

Discography

Albums

Singles

References

External links

Royal on Tooth and Nail alumni page
Royal on Soulscape Records

1980 births
Living people
Norwegian singer-songwriters
21st-century Norwegian singers
21st-century Norwegian women singers